Rony Beard Murray (born 24 November 1988) is a Dominican footballer who plays as a midfielder for Atlético San Francisco and the Dominican Republic national team. He also holds Spanish citizenship.

International career
Beard made his FIFA-recognized international debut on 30 August 2014, when he entered as a 58th-minute substitute in a lost friendly against El Salvador. He had received his first call in May 2014, playing the last 21 minutes of friendly against Indonesia U23.

International goals
Scores and results list Dominican Republic's goal tally first.

References

1988 births
Living people
People from Puerto Plata, Dominican Republic
Dominican Republic footballers
Tercera División players
Divisiones Regionales de Fútbol players
Liga Dominicana de Fútbol players
Cibao FC players
Dominican Republic international footballers
Dominican Republic emigrants to Spain
Naturalised citizens of Spain
Spanish footballers
Association football forwards
Association football midfielders